The 1989 Great American Bank Classic was a women's tennis tournament played on outdoor hard courts at the La Costa Resort and Spa in San Diego, California in the United States that was part of the Category 3 tier of the 1989 WTA Tour. The tournament was held from July 31 through August 6, 1989. First-seeded Steffi Graf won the singles title.

The tournament's purse doubled to $200,000 in 1989, when the sponsor changed to San Diego-based Great American Bank from Virginia Slims, a cigarette brand owned by Philip Morris.

Finals

Singles

 Steffi Graf defeated  Zina Garrison 6–4, 7–5
 It was Graf's 9th singles title of the year and the 39th of her career.

Doubles

 Elise Burgin /  Rosalyn Fairbank defeated  Gretchen Magers /  Robin White 4–6, 6–3, 6–3
 It was Burgin's only title of the year and the 10th of her career. It was Fairbank's only title of the year and the 1st of her career.

References

External links
 ITF tournament edition details
 Tournament draws

Great American Bank Classic
Southern California Open
1989 in sports in California
1989 in American tennis